Greenwell State Park is a public recreation area located on the Patuxent River in St. Mary's County, Maryland. The state park features the historic Rosedale Manor House as well as the Bonds-Simms tobacco barns complex. Park activities include hiking, cycling, horseback riding, fishing, picnicking, hunting, swimming, and canoeing.

History
The park originated in 1971, when John Phillip Greenwell, Jr. and his sister, Mary Wallace Greenwell, donated their  farm to the state for use as a public park. The state subsequently purchased the adjacent  Bond property and added it to the park.

References

External links

Greenwell State Park Maryland Department of Natural Resources
 Greenwell State Park Map Maryland Department of Natural Resources

State parks of Maryland
Parks in St. Mary's County, Maryland
Protected areas established in 1971
1971 establishments in Maryland